Rik de Voest and Bobby Reynolds were the defending champions. They chose to not defend their 2009 title.
Karol Beck and Jaroslav Levinský won in the final 6–3, 6–2, against Benedikt Dorsch and Philipp Petzschner.

Seeds

Draw

Draw

External links
 Doubles Draw

Intersport Heilbronn Open - Doubles
2009 Doubles